The 2009 Amgen Tour of California was the 4th running of an annual cycling race contained within the state of California. The event was staged February 14–22 and began with a prologue in the state capital of Sacramento. The event was held as part of the schedule of both the UCI America Tour and USA Cycling Professional Tour. The race was won by Levi Leipheimer for the third consecutive year.

Race details

Drawing many of the top cyclists from around the world, the Tour of California generated an estimated revenue of $100 million for the state of California.

The  team included two-time returning champion Levi Leipheimer, and seven-time Tour de France winner Lance Armstrong.

Tour organizers have switched the route from year to year, hoping to reach out to fans in different parts of the state and maintain the challenge of the race. Santa Cruz, one of the cities added for the 2009 running, expected added costs of $100,000 to cover public services and accommodations for lodging and meals for the cycling teams, and was expecting 250,000 fans to attend the end of Stage 2. The sales and hotel taxes generated by drawing tourists at a traditionally slow time of the year were expected to help recover the costs of hosting the event. Stage 2 also took the peloton across the Golden Gate Bridge for the first time in the tour's history.

In another first, Stage 4 includes an excursion through the Central Valley and the Sierra Nevada foothills, starting in Merced, then passing through the foothill towns of Mariposa and Oakhurst, and finishing in Clovis (adjacent to Fresno).

The tour organizers tried to integrate climbing into nearly every day's stage; only the prologue, time trial and Stage 5 — the tour's longest at  — had no climbs. The 2009 Tour features at least one King of the Mountain summit on each other stage, with the Tour's technical director proclaiming that the difficult climbs in the course they designed having the potential to have the leader change on a daily basis.

Teams

UCI ProTour Teams
 ALM - 
 AST - 
 GRM - 
 LIQ - 
 QST - 
 RAB - 
 SAX - 
 THR - 

UCI Professional Continental Teams
 BMC - 
 CTT - 

UCI Continental Teams
 BPC - 
 COL - 
 FAS - Fly V Australia
 JBC - 
 OCM - 
 RRC - 
 TT1 -

Stages
For the first time, the 2009 tour had an additional 8th stage meant to increase the competitiveness of the event.

Prologue

Saturday, February 14
Sacramento
Start Time: 1:30 PM
Miles: 2.4
KM: 3.9
End ETA: 4:00 PM

Stage 1
Sunday, February 15
Davis to Santa Rosa
Start Time: 12:00 noon
Miles: 107.6
KM: 173.2
End ETA: 3:56–5:01 PM

Francisco Mancebo of Rock Racing broke away after 5 miles of racing, and stayed away almost all day. He was briefly joined by Tim Johnson and David Kemp in his breakaway effort, but he later broke away from them as well, and they were reabsorbed by the peloton. A 23-man chase group formed as Mancebo neared Santa Rosa, which included four members of Astana, working for two-time defending race champion Levi Leipheimer, as well as some other overall favorites such as Ivan Basso. Race officials decided to extend the "crash zone", the area in which riders would be granted the same finishing time as the group they were in on crashing (should they crash) from the final lap of the Santa Rosa circuit to the first, since the road was saturated by a steady downpour of rain. The chase group started out 12 minutes behind Mancebo and closed the time gap to 1'07" at the beginning of the first lap of the Santa Rosa circuit. They subsequently slowed at the end of the first circuit (since the only thing left to gain was the stage win - the group that was together at the beginning of the first circuit were all given the same finishing time, relative to Mancebo) and allowed some riders to attack, chief among them Vincenzo Nibali and Jurgen Van de Walle, who joined Mancebo at the beginning of the last lap. Mancebo managed to outsprint Nibali and Van de Walle to the line. Stage placings were taken on the first time the riders crossed the finish line, but Van de Walle and Nibali were awarded identical sprint classification points for finishing second and third as the riders credited with finishing second and third, Leipheimer and Michael Rogers.

Stage 2

Monday, February 16
Sausalito to Santa Cruz
Start Time: 8:30 AM
Miles: 115.9
KM: 186.6
End ETA: 12:52–2:03 PM
Note: For the first time, the peloton rode across the Golden Gate Bridge.

After a few unsuccessful breakaway attempts immediately following the neutral zone, Rabobank's Grischa Niermann was the first rider to break free of the peloton. He was quickly joined by Garmin-Slipstream's Steven Cozza and eight other riders, to form a ten-man break that held a four- to five-minute advantage over the peloton for most of the stage. The best placed rider in the break was Ben Jacques-Maynes of Bissell, 5'05" behind race leader Francisco Mancebo, whose Rock Racing team paced the peloton calmly, content to let the breakaway get a lead. When the peloton reached the beginning of the climb of Bonny Doon road, Astana took over the pace, and the time gap to the breakaway fell precipitously. On their respective ways up the climb, Carlos Barredo attacked from the leading group of ten and Levi Leipheimer from the peloton, each coming free. Leipheimer gradually overtook members of the day's breakaway as they faltered on the climb, eventually reaching Barredo, Tom Peterson, and Jason McCartney (Peterson and McCartney had themselves caught Barredo only moments earlier) to take first position on the road. Leipheimer was the first to the top of the climb, and he and Peterson stayed together on the descent. A 17-man chase group paced by Lance Armstrong reabsorbed all the other members of the morning breakaway. Peterson took the stage win uncontested, with Leipheimer just behind him, and the Armstrong group having closed to 20 seconds behind them.

Stage 3

Tuesday, February 17
San Jose to Modesto
Start Time: 12:00 noon
Miles: 104.2
KM: 167.7
End ETA: 3:53–4:55 PM

A 4-man breakaway formed immediately after the stage's neutral zone, comprising Bauke Mollema of Rabobank, Jeff Louder of BMC, Bradley White of OUCH, and Brian Vandborg of Liquigas. The best-placed among them was Mollema, two minutes behind race leader Levi Leipheimer (the rest were nearly 24 minutes behind Leipheimer). King of the Mountains leader Francisco Mancebo joined them shortly thereafter and topped the climb up Sierra Road in first position, padding his lead. He then rejoined the peloton. The breakaway's lead extended to nearly six minutes, which was increased partially because Leipheimer crashed at the front of the peloton at about the 30 mile mark causing the Astana-paced bunch to slow to allow him to rejoin them. The time gap held steady at between four and five minutes for most of the stage, until Team Columbia-High Road, Quick Step, and Cervélo TestTeam came forward after the descent of the second climb of the day to take the pace, working to get the field together so their respective strong sprinters would have a chance at the stage win. Louder attacked from the leading group on the way into Modesto, and only Mollema could answer. They were subsequently caught in the middle of the Modesto circuit, and a classic bunched sprint saw the stage win go to Thor Hushovd.

Stage 4
Wednesday, February 18
Merced to Clovis
Start Time: 11:00 AM
Miles: 115.4
KM: 185.7
End ETA: 3:19–4:29 PM

Several unsuccessful breakaway attempts occurred in the first hour of racing. The breakaway that got away involved Francisco Mancebo, Jason McCartney, Serge Pauwels, and Tyler Hamilton. Mancebo took maximum points in the climbs and intermediate sprints available to him. After topping the fourth climb of the day, Mancebo dropped and rejoined the peloton. The breakaway's biggest advantage was close to six minutes before the peloton, paced chiefly by Team Columbia-High Road, began to chase in earnest, on the descent from the fifth and last climb. The catch occurred with about two miles left to race. A Rabobank rider attacked with the last half mile but was caught by Mark Cavendish, who launched his sprint early but held on in a photo finish for the stage win.

Stage 5

Thursday, February 19
Visalia to Paso Robles
Start Time: 10:00 AM
Miles: 134.3
KM: 216.1
End ETA: 3:00–4:22 PM

This was a rather straightforward day of racing, on a course without even a single categorized climb. After five miles, a six-man breakaway formed, that was eventually whittled to four: Matthew Crane, Glen Chadwick, Pieter Weening, and Cameron Evans. Racing under clear blue skies for the first time in the Tour, the four were caught with about three miles to left to race, as the teams of the prominent sprinters ratcheted up the pace in the peloton to bring them back. The finish was contested in another mass sprint, won for the second day in a row by Mark Cavendish.

Stage 6
Friday, February 20
Solvang - Time Trial
Start Time: 12:00 noon
Miles: 15
KM: 24
End ETA: 2:50 PM

Early times to beat were set by Saxo Bank riders Jens Voigt and Gustav Larsson, with Larsson 13 seconds better of the two (though Voigt's ride was enough to propel him into fourth place in the General Classification). They stood for almost the whole stage, with noted time trial specialists such as George Hincapie and Stef Clement failing to top them. Even former world time trial champion Michael Rogers could not beat Larsson's time. The reigning American national champion David Zabriskie was the first to beat Larsson, by nine seconds. Yellow jersey wearer and two-time defending Tour of California and Solvang time trial champion Levi Leipheimer was the last man to take the course. He was two seconds better than Zabriskie at the intermediate time check and had eight seconds on him at the line, winning the stage.

Stage 7
Saturday, February 21
Santa Clarita to Pasadena
Start Time: 12:00 noon
Miles: 88.9
KM: 143
End ETA: 3:17–3:50 PM

A very aggressive first hour of racing saw many attempted attacks reeled in by the race leader's Astana team. It wasn't until nearly the half the stage, about 40 miles, had been covered that a successful breakaway group of ten formed. They attained a maximum advantage of four minutes, but for the better part of the stage the time gap held steady between two and three minutes, as Astana was content to let them get that lead. On the descent of the one climb of the day, King of the Mountains leader Francisco Mancebo clipped a small rock and tumbled off his bike, suffering a concussion and elbow and hand fractures, which forced him to abandon the race and surrender the KOM lead to Jason McCartney. The riders took five laps on a finishing circuit in the city of Pasadena. On the second lap, an even split in the breakaway formed, with five riders coming 20 seconds clear of the others, but by the end of the third, the group was one again. On the fourth lap, Fränk Schleck attacked from the back of the group and got clear for several minutes, but was eventually caught. The last split saw Rinaldo Nocentini, Hayden Roulston, and Pieter Weening come free on the sprint toward the finish, with Nocentini winning the stage. The other members of the breakaway finished 7 seconds back, and the peloton was 2' 19" behind the stage winner.

Stage 8
Sunday, February 22
Rancho Bernardo to Escondido
Start Time: 12:00 noon
Miles: 96.8
KM: 155.8
End ETA: 3:34–4:43 PM

What was called the Tour of California's queen stage again saw very early attacking. Jason McCartney joined a three-man break that came free of the peloton almost immediately and topped the first two of four categorized climbs on the course in first position, assuring his victory in the King of the Mountains classification. Numerous splits occurred going up the mammoth Mount Palomar climb, with race leader Levi Leipheimer isolated from his teammates at one point, for the first and only time in the Tour, as he had to answer attacks from David Zabriskie and Michael Rogers. A group of GC leaders, along with most of team Astana, consolidated on the descent. Four riders came clear and were in the lead approaching the last climb of the day - Vincenzo Nibali, Fränk Schleck, Bauke Mollema, and Glen Chadwick. Nibali, 2' 21" behind Leipheimer, was a small threat to the race lead, but the Astana-paced leading group kept the time gap at around one minute. After numerous attacks, only Nibali and Schleck remained out front. The chase from the Astana-led group proved too slow to catch Nibali and Schleck, and they were able to survive to finish and contest the stage win between themselves. Schleck opened up a small gap on the Italian in the final straightaway and won the stage.

Classification leadership

In the 2009 Tour of California, five different jerseys were awarded. For the general classification, calculated by adding the finishing times of the stages per cyclist, the leader received a yellow jersey. This classification is considered the most important of the Tour of California, and the winner of the general classification is considered the winner of the Tour of California.

Additionally, there was also a sprints classification, akin to what is called the points classification in other races, which awarded a green jersey. In the sprints classification, cyclists received points for finishing in the top 10 in a stage. The winner got 15 points, second place 12, third 10, fourth 7, and one point less per place down the line, to a single point for tenth. In addition, some points could be won in intermediate sprints.

There was also a mountains classification, which awarded a red jersey. In the mountains classifications, points were won by reaching the top of a mountain before other cyclists. Each climb was categorized, either first, second, third, or fourth category, with more points available for the harder climbs.

There was also a youth classification. This classification is calculated the same way as the general classification, but only young cyclists (under 23) are in. The leader of the young rider classification received a white jersey.

The fifth jersey was not awarded on the basis of a time or points-based classification. It was for each stage's "Most Courageous" rider, akin to the combativity award in the Tour de France. The rider who received this award wore a blue jersey in the next stage. Unlike the Tour de France's combativity award, there was no overall award given.

There was also a classification for teams. In this classification, the times of the best three cyclists per stage were added, and the team with the lowest time was leader.

Jersey wearers when one rider is leading two or more competitions

If a cyclist leads two or more competitions at the end of a stage, he receives all those jerseys. The next stage, he can only wear one jersey, and he wears the jersey representing leadership in the most important competition (yellow first, then green, then red, then white). The other jerseys that the cyclists holds are worn in the next stage by the second-placed rider (or, if needed, third- or fourth-placed rider) of that classification.

After stage 1, Francisco Mancebo received the yellow jersey, the green jersey, and the red jersey, because he was leading the general, sprints, and mountains classifications. In stage 2, he wore the yellow jersey, Tim Johnson wore the green jersey, and David Kemp wore the red jersey.
In stages 3 and 5, Jason McCartney wore the red jersey.
In stage 4, Bauke Mollema wore the red jersey.

Final standings

General Classification

Teams Classification

King of the Mountains Classification

Young Rider Classification

Sprint Classification

References

External links

2009
Tour of California 2009
Tour of California 2009
2009 in sports in California